Steady is the eight track studio album by recording artist Jim Bianco.  It was released on March 21, 2006 in Japan.  Currently, it is only available on iTunes in Japan.

Track listing
All songs written by Jim Bianco.
 “Get On”– 4:01
 “Bad Girl"–3:22
“The Sun Is Gonna Be Here Soon” –2:16
“Downtown”– 4:37
 “If Your Mama Knew”– 3:53
 “Distracted"–3:31
 “Gone”– 3:59
 “Play It One Last Time"–3:01

External links
Official website
Jim Bianco on MySpace
Jim Bianco on Facebook
Jim Bianco on Twitter
Jim Bianco's Youtube Channel

Jim Bianco albums
2006 albums